Borzęcin may refer to the following places in Poland:
Borzęcin, Lower Silesian Voivodeship (south-west Poland)
Borzęcin, Łódź Voivodeship (central Poland)
Borzęcin, Lesser Poland Voivodeship (south Poland)
Borzęcin, Masovian Voivodeship (east-central Poland)
Borzęcin, Pomeranian Voivodeship (north Poland)
Borzęcin, West Pomeranian Voivodeship (north-west Poland)